Stephen LaTreal McNair (February 14, 1973 – July 4, 2009), nicknamed "Air McNair", was an American professional football player who was a quarterback in the National Football League (NFL) for 13 seasons, primarily with the Houston / Tennessee Oilers / Titans franchise. He also played for the Baltimore Ravens.

McNair played college football at Alcorn State University in Lorman, Mississippi, where he won the 1994 Walter Payton Award as the top player in NCAA Division I-AA. He was drafted third overall by the Titans (then known as the Houston Oilers) in 1995, becoming the team's regular starting quarterback in 1997, their first season in Tennessee (though he started six games over the prior two seasons in Houston), and remained the starting quarterback for the Titans through 2005. After the 2005 season, McNair was traded to the Baltimore Ravens, with whom he played for two seasons before retiring.

McNair appeared in the playoffs four times with the Titans, including their run to Super Bowl XXXIV in 2000, and made his final playoff appearance in 2006 with the Ravens. McNair was selected to the Pro Bowl four times, and was an All-Pro and Co-MVP in 2003. McNair was the first African–American quarterback to win AP NFL MVP and remains, along with Cam Newton, Patrick Mahomes, and Lamar Jackson, only one of four to win the award.

Early life
McNair was born in a small tin-roofed house in Mount Olive, Mississippi on February 14, 1973. He had four brothers, Fred, Jason, Michael, and Tim. He attended Mount Olive High School as a freshman in the fall of 1987, where he played football, baseball, and basketball in addition to running track. As a junior, McNair led the Mount Olive Pirates to the state championship. McNair also played free safety in high school, and in 1990 alone, he intercepted 15 passes, raising his career total to 30, which tied the mark established by Terrell Buckley at Pascagoula High School. An All-State selection (offense), McNair was named an All-American by Super Prep magazine (defense).

The Seattle Mariners drafted him in the 35th round of the 1991 MLB amateur draft.

College career
McNair was initially-offered a full scholarship to the University of Florida to play running back, but wanting to play quarterback, McNair chose Alcorn State University, a Historically Black University which competes in the NCAA's Division I-AA (now known as the Football Championship Subdivision) Southwestern Athletic Conference (SWAC). In 1992, McNair threw 3,541 yards and 29 touchdowns, and ran in for 10 more scores. The Braves fashioned a record of 7–4, including a last-second victory in their rematch with Grambling. In that contest, McNair returned from an injury and helped Alcorn State, trailing late in the final period, move deep into Tigers' territory. Then, despite a leg injury, he tucked the ball under his arm and dove into the end zone for the winning touchdown. The victory over Grambling helped the Braves qualify for the I-AA playoffs where they faced off against then-Northeast Louisiana, falling 78–27 to the Indians on November 21, 1992. McNair helped Alcorn State to another good year in 1993, as the Braves upped their record to 8–3 while McNair threw for more than 3,000 yards and 30 touchdowns. He was also named First-Team All-SWAC for the third year in a row.

In his senior season, McNair gained 6,281 combined yards rushing (904) and passing (5,377), along with 56 touchdowns. In the process, he surpassed more than a dozen records and was named an All-American. In addition, McNair won the Walter Payton Award as the top I-AA player and finished third in the Heisman Trophy voting behind Rashaan Salaam and Ki-Jana Carter. McNair set career records for the Football Championship Series with 14,496 passing yards, as well as the division record for total offensive yards with 16,823 career yards. McNair's record for total offensive yards still stands as of 2018, but his mark for career passing yards was eclipsed by Samford quarterback Devlin Hodges in 2018.

He was a member of the fraternity Omega Psi Phi, highlighting his allegiance by tattooing "Omega Man" on his arm.

Statistics

Professional career

Houston / Tennessee Oilers / Titans

1995–1996
With the third overall pick in the 1995 NFL Draft, the Houston Oilers and new head coach Jeff Fisher selected McNair, making him at the time the highest-drafted African-American quarterback in NFL history and signing him to a seven-year contract. McNair did not see his first action until the last two series of the fourth quarter in a November game versus the Cleveland Browns. Late in the season, he also appeared briefly against the Detroit Lions and New York Jets. In 1996, McNair remained a backup to Chris Chandler until starting a game on December 8 in Week 15 against the Jacksonville Jaguars.

1997 season
McNair's first season as the Oilers' starter in 1997 (the team's first year in Tennessee) resulted in an 8–8 record for the team, which played its home games at the Liberty Bowl in Memphis, Tennessee. McNair's 2,665 passing yards were the most for the Oilers in a season since Warren Moon in 1993, and his 13 interceptions were the fewest for a single season in franchise history. He also led the team in rushing touchdowns with eight and ranked second behind running back Eddie George with 674 yards on the ground, at the time the third-highest total for a quarterback in NFL history.

1998 season
In 1998, McNair set career passing highs with 492 attempts, 289 completions, 3,228 yards, and 15 touchdowns for the Oilers, now competing in Nashville. He also cut his interceptions to ten, helping his quarterback rating climb to 80.1.

1999 season: Super Bowl season
The team officially changed its name from Oilers to Titans for the 1999 season as they debuted a new stadium, Adelphia Coliseum. Early in the season, McNair was diagnosed with an inflamed disk following the Titans' 36–35 win over the Cincinnati Bengals, and needed surgery. In his stead entered Neil O'Donnell, a veteran who had guided the Pittsburgh Steelers to the Super Bowl four years earlier. Over the next five games, O'Donnell led the Titans to a 4–1 record. McNair returned against the St. Louis Rams, and with McNair starting, Tennessee won seven of its last nine games, good for a record of 13–3 and second place in the AFC Central.

The Titans opened the playoffs at home against the Buffalo Bills in a Wild Card game, winning on the "Music City Miracle" and eventually advancing to Super Bowl XXXIV in a rematch with the Rams. On the second-to-last play with the Titans facing 3rd down and 5 to go, McNair was hit by two Rams defenders, but he somehow got away and completed a 16-yard pass to Kevin Dyson to gain a 1st down at the Rams' 10-yard line. On the final play of the game, McNair's pass to Dyson was complete, but Dyson was unable to break the plane of the goal line, giving the Rams the win. McNair signed a new six-year contract after the 1999 season worth US$47 million.

2000–2001
McNair played in all sixteen games in 2000 but did not start the first of two annual games against the Steelers. This was because of a sternum injury incurred in a 17–14 win over the Kansas City Chiefs the previous game. Following the Titans’ bye week Neil O'Donnell started against his former team but after O’Donnell threw three picks he was sacked out of the game in the final four minutes. McNair came in and threw a touchdown to Erron Kinney; a missed Steelers field goal attempt resulted in the Titans winning 23–20.

Following a 13–3 season in 2000 which ended in a playoff loss to the Baltimore Ravens, McNair put together his most productive year as a pro in 2001. In 2001, McNair registered career passing highs in yards (3,350), completions (264), touchdowns (21), and quarterback rating (90.2). He was also the team's most effective rusher, tying George for the club lead with five scores. Named to the Pro Bowl for the first time, McNair sat out the game due to a shoulder injury.

2002 season
In 2002, Tennessee finished the regular season 11–5 and reached the playoffs. In the divisional playoff round against the Pittsburgh Steelers, McNair threw for a career postseason high 338 yards and two touchdowns, with two interceptions, while rushing for 29 yards and another score on the ground. The game had a controversial finish when, after missing a game-winning field goal at the end of regulation time and a second failed kick in overtime was negated because of a controversial running-into-the-kicker penalty on Pittsburgh's Dewayne Washington, kicker Joe Nedney won the game from 26 yards out 2:15 into overtime. Steelers coach Bill Cowher said that he called a timeout before the winning kick took place. McNair and the Titans reached the AFC Championship game but were unable to reach the Super Bowl, losing to the Oakland Raiders 41–24.

Between the 2002 and 2003 seasons, McNair was arrested for DUI and illegal gun possession (in May 2003). His blood alcohol was above 0.10, and a 9-mm handgun was sitting in the front of the car. All charges related to the incident were later dropped.

2003 season: MVP Season
In December of the 2003 season, an injured calf and ankle kept McNair sidelined for two games, though he still finished with the best numbers of his career, including 3,215 passing yards, 24 touchdown passes, just seven interceptions, and a quarterback rating of 100.4. The Titans ended at 12–4, the same record as the Colts, but Indianapolis took the AFC South division championship by virtue of its two victories over Tennessee. McNair and Colts quarterback Peyton Manning were named co-NFL MVPs following the 2003 season, which ended for the Titans in a playoff loss to the eventual Super Bowl champion New England Patriots. McNair finished the 2003 season as the league leader in passer rating and became the youngest player in NFL history to pass for 20,000 yards and run for 3,000 yards.

2004–2005 
McNair missed the 2004 season's fourth game with a bruised sternum, an injury suffered the previous week against Jacksonville, and played in only five more games that season. In 2005, he played in 14 games because of a back injury.

This series of season-ending injuries prompted the Titans to make the business decision of locking McNair out of team headquarters in the 2006 offseason. The team would not let him rehab in its building because it feared an injury would force the franchise to pay him $23.46 million (his contract had been restructured so often that his salary cap reached a hard-to-manage amount). The Players Association's filed a grievance on his behalf in which an arbitrator ruled that the team violated its contract, opening the possibility for a trade.

Baltimore Ravens

Following the 2005 season, on April 30, 2006, the Titans allowed McNair and his agent, James "Bus" Cook, to speak with the Ravens to try to work out a deal. On May 1, 2006, the Baltimore Sun reported that the Baltimore Ravens might wait for McNair to be released by the Titans during free agency. Speculation was that the Titans might hold onto McNair until the week before training camp in late July if the Ravens didn't come up with a satisfactory trade offer for McNair according to a league source. However, on June 7, 2006, the two teams worked out a deal to send McNair to the Ravens for a 4th-round pick in the 2007 NFL Draft. On June 8, McNair flew to Baltimore, passed a physical and was announced as the newest member of the Ravens.

2006 season
The 2006 season saw McNair start each game for the Ravens, missing only portions of two games. In the week 14 game against the Kansas City Chiefs, McNair threw the longest regular-season touchdown pass in the Ravens' history, an 89-yard touchdown pass to Mark Clayton. McNair helped Baltimore to a 13–3 record and an AFC North Championship. He made his first playoff start as a Raven against the Colts on January 13, 2007. McNair completed 18 of 29 pass attempts for 173 yards with no touchdowns and two interceptions as the Ravens lost, 15–6.

2007 season
On May 9, 2007, McNair was arrested in Nashville for drunk driving even though he was not driving at the time. It is a misdemeanor offense in Tennessee for an owner of a motor vehicle to knowingly allow an intoxicated person to drive the vehicle. McNair was riding in his own pickup truck as a passenger when the police stopped the truck's driver, McNair's brother-in-law, for speeding. The driver failed a field sobriety test and was arrested for DUI; McNair was charged with DUI by consent. The quarterback's charge was dropped on July 10, 2007 when McNair's brother-in-law pleaded guilty to reckless driving.

In 2007, McNair did not play in Week 2 against the Jets in which the Ravens won 20–13. He also did not play the full game in Week 3, however, the game was won by the Ravens, 26–23. McNair missed nine more games during the rest of the season, due primarily to injury, only starting in six games. He announced his retirement following the 2007 season.

Retirement
After thirteen seasons in the NFL, McNair announced his retirement from professional football in April 2008.

In July 2012, McNair was named the 35th greatest quarterback of the NFL's post-merger era, according to Football Nation.

McNair's number was retired by the Titans during a halftime ceremony against the Indianapolis Colts on September 15, 2019.

McNair was inducted into the Black College Football Hall of Fame in 2012 and the College Football Hall of Fame in 2020.

NFL career statistics

Regular season

Postseason

Personal life
McNair was married to Mechelle McNair from June 21, 1997, until his death. He split his time between a farm in Mississippi and Nashville, Tennessee.

McNair had two sons by Mechelle: Tyler and Trenton; and two sons – Steve LaTreal McNair Jr. and Steven O'Brian McNair – by two other women before they married.

McNair earned the nickname "Air McNair" in high school. He opened his own restaurant in Nashville, which he named Gridiron9.

His cousin is NFL linebacker Demario Davis.

Death

On July 4, 2009, McNair was found dead from multiple gunshot wounds, along with the body of a 20-year-old woman named Sahel "Jenni" Kazemi, in a condominium rented by McNair in downtown Nashville. He was 36 years old. Kazemi and McNair had been previously involved with each other romantically. The day of the shooting, text messages between the pair were exchanged proclaiming their love to one another in which Kazemi texted the victim, "u love me" in which McNair replied, "I love you baby." There was also a conversation about financial issues where McNair transferred $2,000 to Kazemi, who claimed she was "stressed" and needed to pay her phone bill. McNair then offered to come over to check on her after she said her chest felt heavy. The night of his death, McNair put his children to bed, then at 11:00 p.m. he texted Kazemi "On my way." McNair, who was believed to have been asleep on the couch when the shooting occurred, was shot twice in the body and twice in the head, with only one of the shots coming from closer than three feet. After killing him, Kazemi sat on the couch beside him and shot herself in the temple. The bodies were discovered by McNair's friends Wayne Neely and Robert Gaddy, who called 911. The Nashville police declared McNair's death a murder-suicide, with Kazemi as the perpetrator and McNair as the victim. The 9mm gun used was found under Kazemi's body and later tests revealed "trace evidence of (gunpowder) residue on her left hand. Kazemi had a worsening financial situation and also suspected that McNair was in another extramarital relationship.

Two days before their deaths, Kazemi was pulled over in a black 2007 Cadillac Escalade in Nashville. McNair was in the passenger seat and Vent Gordon, a chef at a restaurant McNair owned, was in the back seat. The vehicle was registered in the names of both McNair and Kazemi. She was charged with driving under the influence of alcohol. McNair was not arrested, instead leaving in a taxi with Gordon, despite Kazemi repeatedly asking the arresting officer to tell McNair to come to the police car to talk to her. However, McNair later bailed Kazemi out of jail. The police later stated that after being released from jail, Kazemi purchased the gun from a convicted murderer she met while looking for a buyer for her Kia.

Titans owner Bud Adams released a statement regarding McNair:

In a statement to the AP, Ozzie Newsome, executive vice president and general manager of the Baltimore Ravens, stated:

The Titans held a two-day memorial at LP Field on July 8 and 9, 2009, where fans could pay their last respects to McNair. Highlights from his career were played throughout each day and fans were able to sign books that were later given to the McNair family.

During the 2009 NFL season, every member of the Titans wore a commemorative "9" sticker placed on the back of each helmet to honor McNair. Funeral services were held for McNair at the Reed Green Coliseum on the campus of the University of Southern Mississippi on July 11; he was buried at Griffith Cemetery in Prentiss, Mississippi.

McNair died without a last will and testament, and his assets were frozen pending probate of his estate. On October 15, 2010, it was reported that McNair's widow went to a Nashville judge and asked that at least a portion of the assets be unfrozen for his children's care and expenses until the estate matters were resolved in court. The judge agreed, and each of the four children received $500,000.

References

External links

 
 

1973 births
2009 deaths
African-American players of American football
Alcorn State Braves football players
American Conference Pro Bowl players
American football quarterbacks
American murder victims
Baltimore Ravens players
Burials in Mississippi
College Football Hall of Fame inductees
Deaths by firearm in Tennessee
Ed Block Courage Award recipients
Houston Oilers players
Male murder victims
Murdered African-American people
Murder–suicides in Tennessee
National Football League Most Valuable Player Award winners
National Football League players with retired numbers
People from Mount Olive, Mississippi
People murdered in Tennessee
Players of American football from Mississippi
Players of American football from Tennessee
Tennessee Oilers players
Tennessee Titans players
Violence against men in North America
Walter Payton Award winners